Duri Kosambi is a village in the Cengkareng district of Indonesia. It has postal code of 11750.

See also 
 Cengkareng
 List of administrative villages of Jakarta

west Jakarta
Administrative villages in Jakarta